

156001–156100 

|-bgcolor=#f2f2f2
| colspan=4 align=center | 
|}

156101–156200 

|-bgcolor=#f2f2f2
| colspan=4 align=center | 
|}

156201–156300 

|-bgcolor=#f2f2f2
| colspan=4 align=center | 
|}

156301–156400 

|-bgcolor=#f2f2f2
| colspan=4 align=center | 
|}

156401–156500 

|-bgcolor=#f2f2f2
| colspan=4 align=center | 
|}

156501–156600 

|-id=542
| 156542 Hogg ||  || David W. Hogg (born 1970), American astronomer with the Sloan Digital Sky Survey || 
|}

156601–156700 

|-id=631
| 156631 Margitan ||  || James Margitan (born 1951), atmospheric researcher and manager at JPL's Science Division || 
|}

156701–156800 

|-id=751
| 156751 Chelseaferrell ||  || Chelsea L. Ferrell (born 1988), of the Southwest Research Institute, was a resource analyst working for the New Horizons mission to Pluto. || 
|}

156801–156900 

|-id=879
| 156879 Eloïs ||  || Eloïs Hernandez (born 2007), son of Michel Hernandez, a French astronomer at the Observatory of Saint-Veran where this minor planet was discovered || 
|-id=880
| 156880 Bernardtregon ||  || Bernard Tregon (born 1968), French amateur astronomer, interferometry specialist, and observer at the Pic du Midi Observatory || 
|}

156901–157000 

|-id=939
| 156939 Odegard ||  || John D. Odegard (1941–1998) was an American aviation visionary who started the flight-training program at the University of North Dakota in 1968 that is now known as the John D. Odegard School of Aerospace Sciences. || 
|-id=990
| 156990 Claerbout ||  || Jon Claerbout (born 1938), American geophysicist and contributor to the theory and art of seismic exploration. He is a pioneer of computer-modelling wave propagation and of seismic interferometry, examining the structure of the Earth and the Sun. || 
|}

References 

156001-157000